"Drink the Water" is a song recorded by Jack Johnson on the album Brushfire Fairytales released on February 1, 2001 under the Universal label.

The song was inspired by a surfing accident where Jack Johnson wiped out and nearly drowned after hitting an underwater reef on a fall and cutting his head.

Personnel
Jack Johnson–vocals, guitars
Adam Topol–drums
Merlo Podlewski–bass guitar

References 

2001 songs
Jack Johnson (musician) songs
Songs written by Jack Johnson (musician)